Uludağ Gazoz  (colloquial often called uludağ for short) is a soft drink of the Turkish Manufacturer Erbak-Uludağ İçecek A.Ş. located in Bursa. The carbonated lemonade (Gazoz) is also known in other countries.

The brand name dates back to the development of the classic Uludağ Gazoz in 1930. In addition to the lemon flavour, a version with orange flavour is marketed as Uludağ Gazoz Orange. In 2018, the drinks were exported to more than 30 countries.

In 2013 manufacturer Erbak-Uludağ İçecek A.Ş. achieved a sales total of over 200 million U.S. dollars.

Naming 
The branded labels copy the name of mountain Uludağ located in West Turkey. Previously, the drink was made exclusively from water sources of this mountain. Gazoz is a Turkish lemonade variety, where Uludağ Gazoz is the most well known. The word Gazoz is based on the French word gazeuse or in English gaseous; in the Turkish language, it generally refers to carbonated sweetened lemonade of any kind.

References

External links 
 Uludağ Gazoz company website

Drink companies of Turkey
Turkish cuisine
Pages with unreviewed translations
Lemon-lime sodas